Allium papillare is a species of flowering plant in the Amaryllidaceae family. It is a wild onion found in sandy areas in southern and eastern Israel and the Sinai Peninsula of Egypt. It is a small bulb-forming perennial; flowers have white tepals with purple midveins.

References

papillare
Flora of Egypt
Flora of Israel
Flora of Palestine (region)
Sinai Peninsula
Plants described in 1854
Taxa named by Pierre Edmond Boissier